Boryana may refer to:

Boryana Glacier, glacier on Nordenskjöld Coast in Graham Land, Antarctica
Boryana Rossa (born 1972), Bulgarian interdisciplinary artist
Boryana Kaleyn (born 2000), Bulgarian individual rhythmic gymnast

See also
Boriana Stoyanova (born 1969), Bulgarian artistic gymnast